Tungstic acid refers to hydrated forms of tungsten trioxide, WO3. Both a monohydrate (WO3·H2O) and hemihydrate (WO3·1/2 H2O) are known. Molecular species akin to sulfuric acid, i.e. (HO)2WO2 are not observed.

The solid-state structure of WO3·H2O consists of layers of octahedrally coordinated WO5(H2O) units where 4 vertices are shared. The dihydrate has the same layer structure with the extra H2O molecule intercalated. The monohydrate is a yellow solid and insoluble in water. The classical name for this acid is 'acid of wolfram'. Salts of tungstic acid are tungstates.

The acid was discovered by Carl Wilhelm Scheele in 1781.

Preparation
Tungstic acid is obtained by the action of strong acids on solutions of alkali metallic tungstates. It may also be prepared from the reaction between hydrogen carbonate and sodium tungstate. It can also be obtained from pure tungsten by reaction with hydrogen peroxide.

Uses
It is used as a mordant and a dye in textiles.

References

Tungstic acids